Meera Kosambi (24 April 1939 – 26 February 2015) was an Indian sociologist.

Biography
She was the younger daughter of the illustrious intellectual, historian, linguist, statistician and mathematician, D.D. Kosambi, and granddaughter of Acharya Dharmananda Damodar Kosambi, a Buddhist scholar and a Pāli language expert. Her mother's name was Nalini Kosambi (nee' Madgavkar). She received a Ph.D. in sociology from the University of Stockholm. She is the author of several books and articles on urban sociology and women's studies in India. 

For nearly a decade she served as Director of the Research Centre for Women's Studies at the SNDT University for Women, Mumbai. She worked extensively on the 19th-century Indian feminist Pandita Ramabai, whose writings she compiled, edited and translated from Marathi. She has also translated and edited the autobiography and scholarly writings of her grandfather Dharmananda Damodar Kosambi.

Kosambi died in Pune on 26 February 2015 after a brief illness.

Works
1986 Bombay in Transition : The Growth and Social Ecology of a Colonial City, 1880-1980, Stockholm, Sweden: Almqvist & Wiksell International
1994 Women's Oppression in the Public Gaze: an Analysis of Newspaper Coverage, State Action and Activist Response (edited), Bombay: Research Centre for Women’s Studies, S.N.D.T. Women’s University
1994 Urbanization and Urban Development in India, New Delhi: Indian Council of Social Science Research
1995 Pandita Ramabai’s Feminist and Christian Conversions : Focus on Stree Dharma-neeti, Bombay: Research Centre for Women’s Studies, S.N.D.T. Women’s University
1996 Women in Decision-Making in the Private Sector in India (with Divya Pandey and Veena Poonacha), Mumbai: Research Centre for Women’s Studies, S.N.D.T. Women’s University
2000 Intersections : Socio-Cultural Trends in Maharashtra (edited), New Delhi: Orient Longman, New Delhi
2000 Pandita Ramabai Through Her Own Words: Selected Works (translated, edited and compiled) New Delhi; New York: Oxford University Press
2003 Pandita Ramabai's American Encounter : The Peoples of the United States (1889) (translated and edited), Bloomington: Indiana University Press.
2007 Crossing Thresholds: Feminist Essays in Social History, Ranikhet: Permanent Black
2011 Nivedan: The Autobiography of Dharmanand Kosambi, trans. by Meera Kosambi. Ranikhet: Permanent Black.
2012 Women Writing Gender (edited, translated and with an introduction), Ranikhet: Permanent Black, 
2013 Dharmanand Kosambi: The Essential Writings, ed. by Meera Kosambi. Orient Blackswan.

References

External links
 * Video. Meera Kosambi speaks at the release of Dharmananda Kosambi: The Essential Writings (2013)

Indian women sociologists
Indian feminist writers
Gender studies academics
1939 births
2015 deaths
20th-century Indian women writers
21st-century Indian women writers
20th-century Indian historians
21st-century Indian historians
20th-century Indian social scientists
21st-century Indian social scientists
Women writers from Maharashtra
Women scientists from Maharashtra
Writers from Pune
Women educators from Maharashtra
Educators from Maharashtra
Women historians